Libčice nad Vltavou is a town in Prague-West District in the Central Bohemian Region of the Czech Republic. It has about 3,500 inhabitants.

Geography
It lies in the Prague Plateau. The town is situated on the left bank of the Vltava River, in a meander of the river.

History
The first written mention of Libšice is in a foundation deed of the Břevnov Monastery from 993, when Duke Boleslaus II donated the village to the monastery. In 1850, the railway was built and the village became subsequently industrialized.

The name Libšice was used until 1924. In that year, the neighbouring municipalities of Libšice, Letky and Chejnov were merged into one municipality and under the name Libčice nad Vltavou promoted to a market town. In 1948, it was promoted to a town.

Sights
The most important monument is the Church of Saint Bartholomew. It was a Gothic church from the 14th century, completely rebuilt in the Baroque style in 1763–1769.

The Evangelical church was built in the Neoromanesque style in 1863–1865.

Notable people
Miroslav Štěpánek (1923–2005), artist, animator and film director
Karel Franta (1928–2017), painter and illustrator
Günter Bittengel (born 1966), football player and coach; lives here

Twin towns – sister cities

Libčice nad Vltavou is twinned with:
 Moresco, Italy

References

External links

Cities and towns in the Czech Republic
Populated places in Prague-West District